Voices for Scotland is the campaign arm of the Scottish Independence Convention, formed in April 2019.  The organisation is a civic campaign for Scottish independence, with an aim to get support for Scottish independence above 60%

History 

The Scottish Independence Convention (SIC) is a cross-party, non partisan group with the aim of bringing together pro-independence parties, groups and organisations to promote the concept and ideals of an independent Scotland. The current conveners is Elaine C. Smith, with vice convener Dave Thompson. The SIC was created in 2005 as a forum for those of all political persuasions and none who support independence, and to be a national catalyst for Scottish independence.

Launch 

The organisation was launched on 25 April 2019, setting its aims, relationship with the larger independence referendum, and the research carried out to persuade Scottish residents to back independence.

Organisations 

Several organisations participate within Voices for Scotland to ensure a civic, multi-party campaign, such participants include:

Aberdeen Independence Movement
Business for Scotland
Christians for Independence
Centre for Scottish Constitutional Studies
Common Weal
English Scots for Yes
Fife Plus for Independence
Hubs for Scottish Independence (HUSCI)
Labour for Independence
NHS for Yes
North East Independence Group
Pensioners for Yes
Radical Independence Campaign
Scottish Independence Foundation
Scottish CND
Scottish Green Party
Scottish National Party
Scottish Socialist Party
SNP Students
SNP Youth
Women for Independence
Yes Edinburgh and Lothians
Yes Highlands

See also 
 Scottish Independence Convention
 Future Scottish Independence Referendum

References

Political campaigns in the United Kingdom
Scottish nationalist organisations
Private companies limited by guarantee of Scotland
2019 establishments in Scotland
Cross-party campaigns
Politics of Scotland
Scottish independence